Gail Albert-Halaban (born Gail Hilary Albert, 1970, in Washington, DC) is an American fine art and commercial photographer.  She is noted for her large scale, color photographs of women and urban, voyeuristic landscapes.

Life and career

Albert-Halaban earned her BA from Brown University and her MFA in photography from Yale University School of Art where she studied with Gregory Crewdson, Lois Conner, Richard Benson, Nan Goldin and Tod Papageorge.

Albert-Halaban is represented by Edwynn Houk Gallery in New York City,  in Atlanta, and
Podbielski Contemporary in Milano.

She married Boaz Halaban on June 8, 1997.

About Thirty series 

Albert-Halaban's photographic series About Thirty examines the life of privileged women in New York City and Los Angeles. These scenes of mothers with their nannies or a group of women comparing engagement rings establish both a critique of this kind of lifestyle as well as what the artist calls her own "complicated desire" to be part of this world.

Hopper Redux series 

Albert-Halaban's series Hopper Redux revisits the exact locations in Gloucester, Massachusetts, where Edward Hopper painted. The photographs elicit an uncanny familiarity. They echo Hopper's paintings, but they are decidedly photographic and of the present day. In this sense they seem to oscillate between the historical past and the contemporary present.

Out My Window series 

Albert-Halaban's ongoing series Out My Window consists of elaborately staged photographs of people in their homes, shot from a distance. The architecture of New York City apartment buildings features prominently in the pictures, but the focus is the intimate view of their inhabitants.

Out My Window, Paris series 

Albert-Halaban's series Out My Window, Paris picks up where its namesake leaves off. Set in Paris, Albert-Halaban peers through and photographs what’s behind the windows in the French city’s apartments and courtyards. As with "Out My Window" the residents are knowingly photographed, as if actors on the film set. A set of the Paris photographs first appeared in the French publication Le Monde in November 2012.

Out My Window, global 

Albert-Halaban has published a book called Italian Views with the Aperture Foundation, in which she has photographed from window to neighboring window in cities throughout that nation and collected stories of what neighbors imagine when they look to their neighbor's windows.

She has photographed in countries around the globe including South Korea, Turkey, Portugal, Canada, Argentina, France, and Israel both by traveling to those countries and by using remote technology to photograph from her studio in New York City.

Distinctions
Albert-Halaban's work has appeared in The New York Times, New York, Time, M, World Magazine, Slate, and The Huffington Post. Her fine art photography has been internationally exhibited.

Albert-Halaban was a New York Foundation for the Arts fellow in 2019.

Collections
Albert-Halaban's work is in public and private collections including the Hermes Foundation, George Eastman Museum, Yale University Art Gallery, Nelson Atkins Museum, Getty Museum, Cape Ann Museum, Wichita Art Museum hold her work. She teaches in the Medical Humanities Department at Columbia University.

Teaching
Albert-Halaban teaches in the Narrative Medicine Department at Columbia University where she supports and teaches art-making on the medical campus by both students and faculty.  Her program teaches observation and empathy.  Research shows that education in the humanities improves doctors' performance.

Cross-discipline work
Inspired by her Out My Window photograph series, Sheila Callaghan and Marcus Gardley composed a one-act play Grace & Milt, dramatizing what might happen when neighbors who have never met connect through their windows. Its debut performance, starring Adam O'Byrne and Zoe Winters, took place in April 2019 at Aperture Gallery in New York City.

References

External links 
 
 Friends with Money
 The New York Times
 Houk Gallery
 The New York Times 14 March 2003
 New Yorker 16 March 2009
 Aperture.org
 
 
 

1970 births
Living people
Photographers from Washington, D.C.
20th-century American photographers
21st-century American photographers
Brown University alumni
Yale School of Art alumni
20th-century American women photographers
21st-century American women photographers